Pierre Norman, born Joseph P. Connor (November 16, 1895 – March 31, 1952), was an American clergyman, songwriter, and composer.  He was born in Kingston, Pennsylvania, United States, and died in Teaneck, New Jersey.

As a songwriter he is most famous for co-writing two songs: "You Brought a New Kind of Love to Me" (1930) that appeared in the Maurice Chevalier movie The Big Pond (1930) and "When I Take My Sugar to Tea" (1931), both of which were used in the Marx Brothers movie, Monkey Business, and both of which were co-written with Sammy Fain and Irving Kahal.  He joined ASCAP in 1925.

He was educated at the Wyoming Conservatory and St. Bonaventure College where he received among other degrees, a Doctor of Music.  He also received a musical degree from the Benedictine Fathers. He also studied with Ergildo Martinelli. He was the pastor of St. John's Church in Cliffside, New Jersey; chaplain of the New Jersey State Police for 24 years; and the New Jersey State Guard.

Songs
 "You Brought a New Kind of Love to Me" (from the 1930 film, The Big Pond)
 "The Golden Dawn" (from the 1930 film, Golden Dawn)
 "Little Did I Know" (1930) (words by Pierre Connor & Irving Kahn; music by Vernon Duke & Sammy Fain)
 “Back Home” (1930) (words and music by Irving Kahal, Sammy Fain and Pierre Norman)
 “Homemade Sunshine” (1930) (words by Pierre Connor & Irving Kahal; music by Sammy Fain)
 “I’ve Got “It”, But It Don’t Do Me No Good” (1930) (words by Irving Kahal; music by Sammy Fain & Pierre Norman)
 “If You Could Just Forgive and Forget, I’d Fall in Love all Over Again” (1930) (word by Irving Kahal; music by Sammy Fain & Pierre Norman)
 “Mia Cara” (1930) (words by Irving Kahal; music by Sammy Fain & Pierre Norman) 
 “Once a Gypsy Told Me You Were Mine” (1930) (words and music by Sammy Fain, Irving Kahal & Pierre Norman) 
 “Satan’s Holiday” (used in the 1930 film Follow the Leader) (words and music by Sammy Fain, Irving Kahal & Pierre Norman Connor) 
 "When I Take My Sugar to Tea" (from the 1931 film Monkey Business)
 "Lillies of Lorraine"
 "The Far Green Hills of Home"
 "Little Black Dog"
 "I Shall Return"
 "Lord's Prayer"
 "Our Father"
 "Ave Maria"
 "Miracle of the Bells"

References

1895 births
1952 deaths
Songwriters from Pennsylvania
Record producers from Pennsylvania